Frederica is a 1932 German historical musical drama film directed by  and starring Mady Christians, Hans-Heinz Bollmann and Veit Harlan. It is based on the 1928 operetta of the same name by Franz Lehar which depicts the love affair between Friederike Brion and the young Goethe.

Cast
 Mady Christians as Friederike
 Hans-Heinz Bollmann as Johann Wolfgang Goethe
 Veit Harlan as Herzog Karl August von Weimar
 Eduard von Winterstein as Hauptmann Knebel
 Ferdinand Bonn as Kaiserlicher Rat Goethe
 Erika von Wagner as Elisabeth
 Paul Hörbiger as Pfarrer Brion
 Ida Wüst as Magdalena
 Else Elster
 Otto Wallburg as Ewiger Student Wagner
 Karl Meixner
 Adele Sandrock as Madame Schöll
 Else von Hartmann
 Maria Fein
 Hedwig Wangel
 Leopold von Ledebur as Goethes Wirt
 Theo Lingen as Lachender Herr

References

Bibliography

External links 
 

1932 films
1930s biographical films
1930s musical drama films
Cultural depictions of Johann Wolfgang von Goethe
German biographical drama films
German musical drama films
Films of the Weimar Republic
1930s German-language films
Films set in the 1770s
Operetta films
Films based on operettas
1930s historical musical films
German historical musical films
German black-and-white films
1932 drama films
Films scored by Eduard Künneke
1930s German films